Mein Tou Dekhoonga (Urdu: میں تو دیکھونگا, literal English translation: "I will see it") is a sociopolitical song single from the Pakistani pop rock band Strings, released on April 4, 2011. The song is written and produced by the band founder, lead guitarist and vocalist Bilal Maqsood. The music video of the single "Main Tou Dekhoonga" is directed by Jamshed Mehmood.

Music video
The music video is directed by Jamshed Mehmood (Jami) and is produced by azadfilms co.

Track listing
Mein Tou Dekhoonga

References

External links
Strings Online - Official Website

2011 singles
Strings (band) songs
Pakistani patriotic songs